Robert George Samuels (born 13 March 1971, in Kingston, Jamaica) is a former West Indian cricketer who played in six Tests and eight ODIs from 1996 to 1997.

Career
An opening batsman, Samuels scored 125 in his second Test against New Zealand in 1996. On the tour of Australia later that year, he managed 231 runs at an average of 33 across four Tests. In the final Test at Perth, he contributed 76 in a match-winning 208 run partnership with Brian Lara (132). Despite an unbeaten 35 in the second innings, it would be his final Test for the West Indies.

The high point of his brief ODI career was an unbeaten 36 off 24 balls which helped West Indies to a four wicket win over Australia in Perth. Coming in at 179 for five, Samuels added 86 for the sixth wicket with Lara (90) to pull of an unlikely victory.

Family
He is the older brother of Marlon Samuels, who is also a former West Indian cricketer.

References

1971 births
Living people
Sportspeople from Kingston, Jamaica
West Indies Test cricketers
West Indies One Day International cricketers
Jamaican cricketers
Commonwealth Games competitors for Jamaica
Cricketers at the 1998 Commonwealth Games
Jamaica cricketers